The Liesbeek River (also spelt Liesbeeck) is a river in Cape Town in South Africa.  It is named after a small river in the Netherlands. The first "free burghers" of the Dutch East India Company were granted land to farm along the river in 1657, shortly after the first Dutch settlers arrived in the Cape.  The river was originally called the Amstel or Versse Rivier. It is the first river that Jan van Riebeeck named.

The headwaters flow from the eastern slopes of Table Mountain above Kirstenbosch Botanical Gardens where the vegetation is largely indigenous. The slopes of Bishopscourt have large properties, including Jan van Riebeeck's farm. Water abstraction occurs here, often to water residential gardens, causing the flow to reduce during the summer months.

In Newlands, there are smaller residential plots. South African Breweries and the Josephine Mill are located here. From Rondebosch, large sections of the river are canalised, and the short sections of the river that are not canalised are degraded by erosion as a consequence of the increased flow from the canalised sections.

Below Rosebank and Mowbray, at Observatory, is the confluence of the Liesbeek and Black River . The Two Rivers Urban Park is located on land between the Liesbeek and the Black with heritage sites and designated public open spaces. The Black River empties into Table Bay at Paarden Eiland.

The Liesbeeck is home to the Platanna, or African clawed frog, an amphibian that has been important in certain areas of medical research.

Walking the Liesbeek

It is perfectly possible to walk almost the entire length of the Liesbeek River on public footpaths. The whole walk is about 9.7 km in length, and should take about two to two-and-a-half hours.

Starting from where the Liesbeek emerges from Kirstenbosch Botanical Gardens in Bishopscourt, walk from The Hill Pre-Primary School on Winchester Avenue through the old Boschenheuwel arboretum. You can follow its route for the first 500 metres or so, to the point where it enters a private estate.

Pick the river up again in Fernwood at the junction of Kirstenbosch Drive and St Albans Close; cross over to Riverside Road, where there is a path next to the river through Fernwood to the point where is passes under Edinburgh Drive. The Upper Liesbeek River Garden in Fernwood is the first formal park along the river's banks. Continue to walk along Riverside Road, then cross Edinburgh Drive and enter Paradise Park. The river comes down a cascade through the Park. A pedestrian bridge crosses the river, which you should use to follow the bank on the east side of the Park.

Access to the Liesbeek River bank temporarily ends at the boundary of the Vineyard Hotel. This is the only major part of the River that passes through private property. Leave the Park and walk up to Bucksburn Road; turn left onto Bucksburn, then right into Lothian Road. Follow Colinton Road past the Vineyard Hotel—you could call in to the Hotel for a coffee and walk down through the Hotel's grounds to the path next to the river, but you'll have to leave through the Hotel again as there is no other way out. Turn left into Kildare Road - you can catch a glimpse of the river as the road crosses it. The river continues through private property parallel with Main Street; turn right opposite the entrance to SACS into Sans Souci Road and pick up the river again on the left just before Newlands Swimming Pool.

From there, the Liesbeek River Trail takes you right through to Belmont Road in Rosebank. After passing under Main Road, the Trail passes Josephine Mill and the site of the Newlands Stadium, crossing back and forth over pedestrian bridges. It finally ends at the back of the Riverside Mall on Main Road Rosebank. From here, the path is informal, between the canalised bank and the grounds of St Joseph's Marist College in Rondebosch. From Belmont Road, the path eventually reaches the Liesbeek Parkway at the junction with Alma Road in Mowbray.

From here, cross the Liesbeek Parkway, and follow the route of the river through Mowbray, under Settlers Way (N2) to the Two Rivers Urban Park. The path continues opposite the Valkenberg Hospital and the South African Astronomical Observatory to the gates of the River Club in Observatory. The confluence with the Swart (Black) River is in sight, which continues on through Paarden Eiland to empty into Table Bay.

References

External links
Friends of the Liesbeek

Gallery

Rivers of the Western Cape
Geography of Cape Town
Natural history of Cape Town